Battyeford railway station served the village of Battyeford in West Yorkshire, England.

History
Built by the London and North Western Railway and opened in 1900, the Leeds New Line linked Huddersfield and Leeds via the Spen Valley. It diverged from the existing LNWR line at Heaton Lodge junction and passed under the L&YR Manchester Leeds line before crossing the River Calder on a girder bridge and continuing onto the Battyeford viaduct. Battyeford station was situated at the northern end of the viaduct, with the platforms extending onto the span over Huddersfield road (now the A644). A large goods yard and shed were situated on the Leeds side of the station.

The station has been demolished, with only the embankment north of the A644 remaining. The goods yard has been used for new housing (Littlemore Grove).

References

External links
History and pictures of Battyeford railway station
Route and plan of station

Disused railway stations in Kirklees
Former London and North Western Railway stations
Railway stations in Great Britain opened in 1900
Railway stations in Great Britain closed in 1953